Henry X Rumpold, Duke of Żagań also known as the Younger (c. 1390 – 18 January 1423), was a Duke of Żagań-Głogów during 1397–1412 (as co-ruler of his brothers) and since 1412 ruler over Głogów (as co-ruler of his brother).

He was the third son of Henry VIII the Sparrow, Duke of Głogów by his wife Katharina, daughter of Duke Władysław of Opole.

Life
After the early death of his father in 1397, Henry X was first under the care of his mother and the guardianship of Duke Rupert I of Legnica, and since 1401 under the tutelage of his older brothers Jan I and Henry IX the Older.

In 1412 was made the formal division of the paternal lands. Henry X, received together with his brothers Henry IX and Wenceslaus the Duchy of Głogów; however, he wasn't interested in the internal affairs of the Duchy and leave all the government in the hands of Henry IX.

Henry X remained at the service of the Emperor Sigismund. In 1420, together with his brothers, he participated in the great congress of Wroclaw, where he paid homage to the Emperor. Also, he took part in expeditions against the Hussites, and shortly after was appointed Governor of the Upper Lusatia. After the death of his mother, he inherited, together with Henry IX, the towns of Kożuchów and Zielona Góra.

Under the service of Emperor Sigismund, Henry X was a mediator in international affairs, and he was sent in a diplomatic mission to Denmark, where after successfully negotiations with the King Eric, was arranged his betrothal with the King's first cousin Adelaide (b. 1410 - d. aft. 1445), daughter of Duke Bogislaw VIII of Pomerania-Stargard; but he died soon after in a military camp in Flubsberg. He was buried in Hadersleben (Haderslev).

References

Chronological Dates in Stoyan
This article was translated from his original in Polish Wikipedia.

|-

1390s births
1423 deaths
Dukes of Żagań